Lente may refer to:

 Lente insulin, a discontinued formulation of human insulin as a medicine.
 Lente Loco, Spanish-language comedy television series.
 'Festina lente', adage.
 Derrick J. Lente, New Mexico politician.
 Miklós Lente, Canadian cinematographer

See also
 Lento (disambiguation)